HLA-B59 (B59) is an HLA-B serotype. The serotype identifies the more common HLA-B*## gene products. B59 is a hybrid between B*55 and B*51. B59 is more common in Japan, Korea, N. China and Mongolia. (For terminology help see: HLA-serotype tutorial)

Serotype

B*5901 allele frequencies

References

5